Baytally (Baytallı) is a rural locality (a selo) and the administrative centre of Rasmekeyevsky Selsoviet, Kushnarenkovsky District, Bashkortostan, Russia. The population was 445 as of 2010. There are 10 streets.

Geography 
Baytally is located 16 km southwest of Kushnarenkovo (the district's administrative centre) by road. Rasmekeyevo is the nearest rural locality.

References 

Rural localities in Kushnarenkovsky District